Lárus Þórarinn Blöndal Björnsson was an Icelandic sýslumaður and alþingismaður. He served as Vice President of Alþingi in 1833, and as Alþingismaður  from 1880–1885.

Personal life
Lárus was the son of Björn Blöndal who famously presided over the case of Agnes and Friðrik, and father in law to Jóhannes Jóhannesson, speaker of Alþingi between 1918-1921 and 1924-1926.

References

External links
 Lárus Blöndal, Secretariat of Althingi, retrieved 22 January 2022
 Tímarit.is (in Icelandic), retrieved 22 January 2022
 Garður.is (in Icelandic), retrieved 22 January 2022
 Breiðfirðingur - 1. tölublað (01.04.1999)  (in Icelandic), retrieved 22 January 2022
 Tíminn Sunnudagsblað - 23. tölublað (20.06.1971) (in Icelandic), retrieved 22 January 2022
 Morgunblaðið - 198. tölublað (24.08.2018) (in Icelandic), retrieved 22 January 2022
 Húnavaka - 1. tölublað (01.05.1979) (in Icelandic), retrieved 22 January 2022

1836 births
 1894 deaths
Members of the Althing